The Holy Cross Cathedral also called Catholic Cathedral of Honiara Is the name given to a religious building affiliated with the Catholic Church which is located in the city of Honiara on the Guadalcanal Island capital of the Solomon Islands a country in the southwest Pacific Ocean.

Its history goes back to 1957 when a church was constructed that would be the first pro-cathedral or temporary cathedral dedicated to the Holy Cross in the place where Alvaro de Mendaña a Spanish navigator that carried out two expeditions to the Pacific «discovering» the Solomon Islands, is believed placed the first cross in 1565. In 1957 the current cathedral was blessed and opened to the public. A brick of the first Catholic mission in the Solomon Islands, built in 1845 was incorporated into the facade. There are several carved elements such as those seen on the altar and the lectern where it is possible to see the influence of local culture in the church.

The temple follows the Roman or Latin rite and is the seat of the Metropolitan Archdiocese of Honiara (Archidioecesis Honiaranus) which was elevated to its present status by the bull "Laetentur insulae multae" in 1978 by the then Pope John Paul II.

It is under the pastoral responsibility of Bishop Christopher Michael Cardone.

See also
Roman Catholicism in the Solomon Islands
Holy Cross

References

Roman Catholic cathedrals in the Solomon Islands
Buildings and structures in Honiara
Roman Catholic churches completed in 1957
20th-century Roman Catholic church buildings